The 1968–69 daytime network television schedule for the three major English-language commercial broadcast networks in the United States covers the weekday and weekend daytime hours from September 1968 to August 1969.

Talk shows are highlighted in  yellow, local programming is white, reruns of older programming are orange, game shows are pink, soap operas are chartreuse, news programs are gold, children's programs are light purple and sports programs are light blue. New series are highlighted in bold.

Monday-Friday
{| class=wikitable style="font-size:90%"
! width="1.5%" bgcolor="#C0C0C0" colspan="2"|Network
! width="4%" bgcolor="#C0C0C0"|6:00 am
! width="4%" bgcolor="#C0C0C0"|6:30 am
! width="4%" bgcolor="#C0C0C0"|7:00 am
! width="4%" bgcolor="#C0C0C0"|7:30 am
! width="4%" bgcolor="#C0C0C0"|8:00 am
! width="4%" bgcolor="#C0C0C0"|8:30 am
! width="4%" bgcolor="#C0C0C0"|9:00 am
! width="4%" bgcolor="#C0C0C0"|9:30 am
! width="4%" bgcolor="#C0C0C0"|10:00 am
! width="4%" bgcolor="#C0C0C0"|10:30 am
! width="4%" bgcolor="#C0C0C0"|11:00 am
! width="4%" bgcolor="#C0C0C0"|11:30 am
! width="4%" bgcolor="#C0C0C0"|noon
! width="4%" bgcolor="#C0C0C0"|12:30 pm
! width="4%" bgcolor="#C0C0C0"|1:00 pm
! width="4%" bgcolor="#C0C0C0"|1:30 pm
! width="4%" bgcolor="#C0C0C0"|2:00 pm
! width="4%" bgcolor="#C0C0C0"|2:30 pm
! width="4%" bgcolor="#C0C0C0"|3:00 pm
! width="4%" bgcolor="#C0C0C0"|3:30 pm
! width="4%" bgcolor="#C0C0C0"|4:00 pm
! width="4%" bgcolor="#C0C0C0"|4:30 pm
! width="4%" bgcolor="#C0C0C0"|5:00 pm
! width="4%" bgcolor="#C0C0C0"|5:30 pm
! width="4%" bgcolor="#C0C0C0"|6:00 pm
! width="4%" bgcolor="#C0C0C0"|6:30 pm
|-
! rowspan="4" bgcolor="#C0C0C0" |ABC
! Fall
| rowspan="2" colspan="9" |Local
| rowspan="2" colspan="3" bgcolor="yellow" |The Dick Cavett Show
| rowspan="4" bgcolor="orange" |Bewitched
| rowspan="2" bgcolor="pink" |Treasure Isle
| rowspan="4" bgcolor="pink" |Dream House
| bgcolor="bf9fef" |It's Happening1:55: The Children's Doctor
| rowspan="4" bgcolor="pink" |The Newlywed Game
| rowspan="4" bgcolor="pink" |The Dating Game
| rowspan="4" bgcolor="chartreuse" |General Hospital
| rowspan="4" bgcolor="chartreuse" |One Life to Live
| rowspan="4" bgcolor="chartreuse" |Dark Shadows
| colspan="3" rowspan="4" |Local
| rowspan="3" bgcolor="gold" |ABC Evening News
| rowspan="4" |Local
|-
! mid-Fall
| bgcolor="pink" |Funny You Should Ask1:55: The Children's Doctor
|-
! Winter
| colspan="12" rowspan="2" |Local
| bgcolor="pink" |Funny You Should Ask12:55: The Children's Doctor
| rowspan="2" bgcolor="pink" |Let's Make a Deal
|-
!Summer
| bgcolor="orange" |That Girl 
| bgcolor="gold" |ABC News
|-
! rowspan="3" bgcolor="#C0C0C0" |CBS
!Fall
| rowspan="3" bgcolor="gold" |Sunrise Semester
| rowspan="3" |Local
| rowspan="2" bgcolor="gold" |7:05: CBS Morning News
| rowspan="2" |Local
| colspan="2" rowspan="3" bgcolor="bf9fef" |Captain Kangaroo
| colspan="2" rowspan="3" bgcolor="white" |Local
| rowspan="3" bgcolor="orange" |The Lucy Show 
| rowspan="3" bgcolor="orange" |The Beverly Hillbillies 
| rowspan="3" bgcolor="orange" |The Andy Griffith Show 
| rowspan="3" bgcolor="orange" |The Dick Van Dyke Show 
| rowspan="3" bgcolor="chartreuse" |Love of Life12:25 pm: CBS News
| rowspan="3" bgcolor="chartreuse" |Search for Tomorrow
| rowspan="3" |Local
| rowspan="3" bgcolor="chartreuse" |As the World Turns
| rowspan="3" bgcolor="chartreuse" |Love Is a Many Splendored Thing
| rowspan="3" bgcolor="chartreuse" |The Guiding Light
| rowspan="3" bgcolor="chartreuse" |The Secret Storm
| rowspan="3" bgcolor="chartreuse" |The Edge of Night
| bgcolor="yellow" |Art Linkletter's House Party4:25: CBS News| colspan="4" rowspan="3" |Local
| rowspan="3" bgcolor="gold" |CBS Evening News|-
!Spring
| bgcolor="yellow" |The Linkletter Show4:25: CBS News|-
!Summer
| colspan="2" bgcolor="gold" |CBS Morning News| bgcolor="yellow" |The Linkletter Show|-                                                                                                                  
! rowspan="4" bgcolor="#C0C0C0" |NBC
! Fall
| colspan="2" rowspan="4" |Local
| colspan="4" rowspan="4" bgcolor="gold" |Today| colspan="2" rowspan="4" bgcolor="white" |Local
| rowspan="2" bgcolor="pink" |Snap Judgment10:25: NBC News| rowspan="4" bgcolor="pink" |Concentration| rowspan="4" bgcolor="pink" |Personality| rowspan="4" bgcolor="pink" |Hollywood Squares| rowspan="4" bgcolor="pink" |Jeopardy!| rowspan="4" bgcolor="pink" |Eye Guess12:55: NBC News| rowspan="4" bgcolor="white" |Local
| bgcolor="pink" |Let's Make a Deal| rowspan="4" bgcolor="chartreuse" |Days of Our Lives| rowspan="4" bgcolor="chartreuse" |The Doctors| rowspan="4" bgcolor="chartreuse" |Another World| rowspan="4" bgcolor="pink" |You Don't Say!| rowspan="4" bgcolor="pink" |The Match Game4:25: NBC News| colspan="4" rowspan="4" |Local
| rowspan="4" bgcolor="gold" |The Huntley–Brinkley Report|-
! Winter
| rowspan="2" bgcolor="chartreuse" |Hidden Faces|-
! Spring
| rowspan="2" bgcolor="pink" |It Takes Two10:25: NBC News|-
! Summer
| bgcolor="pink" | You're Putting Me On|}

Saturday

Sunday

By network
ABC

Returning series:ABC NewsThe New Beatles Bewitched The Bullwinkle ShowThe Children's DoctorDark ShadowsThe Dating GameThe Dick Cavett ShowDiscoveryDream HouseThe Fantastic Four ShowGeneral HospitalGeorge of the JungleIssues and AnswersFilmation's Journey to the Center of the EarthThe King Kong Show Let's Make a Deal (moved from NBC)Linus the LionheartedIt's Happening!The New American Bandstand 1969The New Casper Cartoon ShowThe Newlywed GameOne Life to LiveSpider-ManTreasure IsleNew series:The Adventures of GulliverThe Dudley Do-Right ShowFantastic VoyageFunny You Should AskHappening '69 (January 4-25) & Happening (from February 1 to September 20, 1969)That Girl 

Not returning from 1967-68:The Baby GameDateline:HollywoodThe Dream Girl of '67The Beagles The Donna Reed Show Everybody's TalkingThe Family GameThe Fugitive The Honeymoon RaceThe Magilla Gorilla ShowHow's Your Mother-In-Law?The Milton the Monster ShowNews with the Woman's TouchPeter Jennings with the NewsThe Peter Potamus Show TemptationTennessee Tuxedo and His Tales (reruns)This Morning with Dick CavettWedding PartyCBS

Returning series:The Andy Griffith Show Aquaman Art Linkletter's House PartyAs the World TurnsThe Beverly Hillbillies The Bugs Bunny/Road Runner HourCamera ThreeCaptain KangarooCBS Evening NewsCBS Morning NewsCBS NewsThe Dick Van Dyke Show The Edge of NightFace the NationThe Guiding LightThe Herculoids Jonny Quest Lamp Unto My FeetThe Linkletter ShowThe Lone RangerLook Up and LiveLove Is a Many Splendored ThingLove of LifeMoby Dick and Mighty MightorThe NFL TodayThe Original Amateur Hour / The New Ted Mack & the Original Amateur HourSearch for TomorrowThe Secret StormShazzanSunrise SemesterTom and JerryNew series:The Archie ShowThe Batman/Superman HourThe Go Go Gophers ShowThe Lucy Show Wacky RacesNot returning from 1967-68:Frankenstein Jr. and The ImpossiblesThe Road Runner Show (Combined into The Bugs Bunny/Road Runner Hour)Space Ghost and Dino BoyThe Superman/Aquaman Hour of AdventureTo Tell the Truth  Underdog (Returned to NBC)

NBC

Returning series:Another WorldBirdman and the Galaxy TrioConcentrationCool McCoolDays of Our LivesThe DoctorsEye GuessThe Flintstones The Frank McGee ReportFrontiers of FaithHollywood SquaresJeopardy!The Match GameMeet the PressNBC NewsNBC Saturday Night NewsNBC Sunday Night NewsPersonalitySnap JudgmentSuper President & Spy ShadowThe Super 6The Today ShowTop Cat The Underdog Show  (Moved from CBS)You Don't Say!New series:The Banana Splits Adventure HourHidden FacesIt Takes TwoStorybook SquaresThe Untamed WorldYou're Putting Me OnNot returning from 1967-68:The Atom Ant/Secret Squirrel ShowLet's Make a Deal (Moved to ABC)Samson & GoliathYoung SamsonSee also
1968-69 United States network television schedule (prime-time)
1968-69 United States network television schedule (late night)

Sources
Castleman & Podrazik, The TV Schedule Book'', McGraw-Hill Paperbacks, 1984
TV schedules, NEW YORK TIMES, September 1968-September 1969 (microfilm)

United States weekday network television schedules
1968 in American television
1969 in American television